The women's doubles squash event of the 2015 Pan American Games was held from July 13–14 at the Exhibition Centre in Toronto. The defending Pan American Games champion are Nayelly Hernández and Samantha Terán of Mexico.

Schedule
All times are Central Standard Time (UTC-6).

Results

Draw

Final standings

References

External links 
 Results on squashsite.co.uk

Squash at the 2015 Pan American Games
2015 in women's squash